Wolverhampton South was a parliamentary constituency in the town of Wolverhampton in the West Midlands of England.  It returned one Member of Parliament to the House of Commons of the Parliament of the United Kingdom.

History

The constituency was created by the Redistribution of Seats Act 1885 for the 1885 general election, when the former two-seat Wolverhampton constituency was divided into three single-member constituencies.

It was abolished for the 1918 general election.

Boundaries 
The civil parish of Bilston, and part of the civil parish of Sedgley.

Members of Parliament

Elections

Elections in the 1880s

Elections in the 1890s 

Villiers' death caused a by-election.

Elections in the 1900s

Elections in the 1910s

See also
List of Members of Parliament for Wolverhampton
List of parliamentary constituencies in Wolverhampton

References 

Parliamentary constituencies in the West Midlands (county) (historic)
Parliamentary constituencies in Staffordshire (historic)
Constituencies of the Parliament of the United Kingdom established in 1885
Constituencies of the Parliament of the United Kingdom disestablished in 1918
Parliamentary constituencies in Wolverhampton